;  is a Japanese steel manufacturer. It is a member of the Toyota Group.

History
Aichi Steel was one of the earliest subsidiaries of the Toyota Group. Kiichiro Toyoda, Toyota's founder struggled to manufacture automobiles as steel producers were uninterested to supply his small workshop the steel sheets for automobiles. To address the problem, Toyoda bought his own furnace that provided his company, the casting expertise and forming equipment that would shape a car. This iron workshop became the precursor of Aichi Steel.

The company was established in 1934 as Aichi Seiko, the steel manufacturing department of Toyoda Automatic Loom Works, the predecessor of Toyota Industries. The company derived its name from Aichi Prefecture, where Toyota's headquarters and major production facilities are located. It became an independent company in 1940 and changed its name to its present one in 1945.

Today, Aichi Steel supplies 40% of the steel, springs and forged products for automotive use to members of the Toyota Group. This volume underscored Toyota's reliance on the partnership given the sophisticated nature of Aichi's manufacturing services, which few suppliers can replicate. In January 2016, a furnace explosion in one of Aichi's steel mills suspended production at Toyota's entire assembly plants for one week and threatened further disruptions to the company's operations for almost two months.

References

External links
Company website 
Company website 
 Wiki collection of company history books on Aichi Steel.

Steel companies of Japan
Titanium companies of Japan
Companies based in Aichi Prefecture
Companies listed on the Tokyo Stock Exchange
Companies listed on the Nagoya Stock Exchange
Manufacturing companies established in 1940
Toyota Group
Japanese brands
Japanese companies established in 1940